Kayla Williams may refer to:

 Kayla Williams (author) (born 1976), U.S. Army linguist
 Kayla Williams (gymnast) (born 1993), American gymnast